Adalia is a genus of ladybugs in the family Coccinellidae. It contains only two species, A. bipunctata and A. decempunctata.

Ecology and biogeography
Adalia bipunctata is present in Europe, Asia, North America and New Zealand.

The two species are predominantly aphidophagous, but also show cannibalism and prey on other ladybirds.

Adalia species are subject to parasitism by male-killing bacteria: invasion of one insect species, A. bipunctata, by two different male-killing bacteria, phorid and degeerid flies, as well as sexually transmitted Coccipolipus hippodamiae mites.

See also
List of Coccinellidae genera and species

References

Coccinellidae genera
Taxa named by Étienne Mulsant